The canton of Saint-Dizier-3 is an administrative division of the Haute-Marne department, northeastern France. It was created at the French canton reorganisation which came into effect in March 2015. Its seat is in Saint-Dizier.

It consists of the following communes:
Bettancourt-la-Ferrée
Chancenay
Saint-Dizier (partly)

References

Cantons of Haute-Marne